Dr. Jack Blumenau (born 22 November 1986) is a British actor and a lecturer.

Biography
Blumenau was born to casting director Debbie O'Brien, and director/actor Colin Blumenau, so it was natural for him to follow an acting career. He began acting at age 12. He spent his early youth in Ashwell, Hertfordshire, attending Ashwell JMI until 1998, and The Highfield School in Letchworth from 1998 to 2008.

Blumenau has two brothers, Dan and Harry.

Education 
In 2009, Bluemanu gained his B.Sc from the London School of Economics and Political Science. In 2012 he gained his M.Phil in European Politics and Society from Oxford University. In 2016 he gained his Ph.D in Political Science from London School of Economics and Political Science.

Today, Blumenau is an assistant professor in the Department of political science at University College London.

Selected credits

Theatre
Peter Pan (2003–04, Savoy) - Peter Pan
The Prisoner's Dilemma (RSC Barbican) - Jan
The Pirates of Penzance (2003–04, Savoy) - young pirate, and Frederick
Sherlock Holmes – The Athenaeum Ghoul (2005, UK tour) - Billy
The Taming of the Shrew (2006, Bristol Old Vic) - Biondello
Little Eyolf (2007, English Touring Theatre, rehearsed reading)
Black-Eyed Susan (2007, Theatre Royal Bury St Edmunds/ Theatre Royal Wakefield) - Jacob
Animal Magnetism (2008, Theatre Royal Bury St Edmunds)
Red Fortress (2008, Unicorn Theatre) - Luis
The York Realist (2009, Riverside Studios) - Jack
The Lion, The Witch, and The Wardrobe (2009, New Vic Theatre, Newcastle-under-Lyme) - Edmund
Bleak House (2010, New Vic Theatre, Newcastle-under-Lyme)

Television
Best Friends (2004, Citv) - Callum
Noah and Saskia (2004, BBC TV/ABC Australia Series) - Noah
Half Life (BBC TV) - Dylan
There's a Viking in My Bed (BBC TV Series) - Tim
Reach for the Moon (LWT Series) - Kyle
Microsoap (BBC TV) - Danny
Hello! (NC Grivas Productions) - Peter
Start Now (NC Grivas Productions) - Ron
The Railway Children (2000, Carlton Film Productions) - Peter
Genie in the House (2006 episode Election - Ricky; 2007 episode Emma TV - Harold, Nickelodeon)
As the Bell Rings (2007 episodes O Romeo and A Touch of Class, Disney Channel UK) - Tinker
Doctors (2008 episode, Yesterday's News) - Glen Preece

Film
The Glow (2001 short movie, Glory Films) - David
Dr Jekyll and Mr Hyde (2002 television movie, Clerkenwell Films) - Ned Chandler 
Origin (short, 2011) - Freddy Holmes

Audio/Narration
The Hoobs (Jim Henson Productions) - narrator
The Ghost of Thomas Kempe (First Writes/Radio 4) - James
Spots's Bedtime Stories (Penguin/3T Prod) - Spot
Charlie and the Chocolate Factory (Penguin Audio Books) - Charlie
Charlie and the Great Glass Elevator (Penguin Audio Books) - Charlie
Teddy Robinson (Penguin Audio Books) - Philip
Mansfield Park (Radio 4)

References

 2004 Interview with Jack Blumenau
Jack Blumenau's website.

1986 births
Living people
English male television actors
English male stage actors
English male musical theatre actors
English male radio actors
English male voice actors
English political scientists
Alumni of the London Academy of Music and Dramatic Art
People from Ashwell, Hertfordshire